Ethmia treitschkeella is a moth in the family Depressariidae. It was described by Staudinger in 1879. It is found in Asia Minor.

References

Moths described in 1897
treitschkeella